Unity College is a mixed 11-16 comprehensive school in Burnley, Lancashire, England.

History

Former school
Towneley High School originally opened in 1941. During its history it had been a technical school, an all-boys school, and latterly a mixed 11-16 community school. It was the first Lancashire school to be awarded by Investors in People.

Early history
The College initially occupied the former Towneley High School, but moved to a state of the art new £33m building in September 2010 as part of the Building Schools for the Future programme. The school was named by a local pupil, Heather Ashworth, who won a competition launched by the local radio station 2BR. The new school's first head teacher, Sally Cryer, had previously been head at Towneley. The school is located in Towneley Park, and the county council's decision to site the new building, on playing-fields close to the old school, rather than reusing the existing site, was contentious. Despite plans to turn the old site into parkland, objections from local residents prompted the borough council's refusal to sell the land, triggering a 2007 public inquiry that subsequently backed the plans.

The 20 January 2011 edition of Question Time was broadcast from Unity College, with some pupils in the audience.

Attainment

In 2007, the school's value-added measure was 971 (national average 1000), which placed it in the bottom 5% nationally for adding value between the end of Key Stage 2 and the end of Key Stage 4.
In 2009 the college had increased its attainment to 29% 5 A*-C passes including English and Maths.  The college has also improved its 5A*-C measure from below 30% to 64% in just three years.

Notable former pupils
 Ross Sykes, professional footballer
Luke Jordan, English footballer

Towneley High School
 Dr Christine Braddock DBE, Chief Executive of Birmingham Metropolitan College and High Sheriff of the West Midlands (2013–14).
 Alice (Anne) Nutter, Chumbawamba musician and writer. 
 David Readman, singer.
 Stella Reid, TV nanny.

References

Schools in Burnley
Educational institutions established in 2006
Secondary schools in Lancashire
Foundation schools in Lancashire
2006 establishments in England